Leo Ubbelohde (4 January 1877, Hanover – 28 February 1964, Düsseldorf) was a German chemist.

During his career he served as a professor in Karlsruhe and Berlin. He is known for his research on mineral oils, fuels, catalysis and viscosity.

He was the inventor of a suspended-level viscometer used for determining kinetic viscosity, known today as a "Ubbelohde viscometer".

Publications 
 Über Kondensationen der Isatinsäure und des o-Amidobenzaldehyds mit Isonitrosoaceton, (1903)
 Handbuch der Chemie und Technologie der Öle und Fette :  Chemie, Analyse, Gewinnung und Verarbeitung der Öle, Fette, Wachse und Harze. 
 Zur Viskosimetrie. Anhang : Umwandlungs-tabellen für Viskositätszahlen, (1940).

References 

20th-century German chemists
Scientists from Hanover
1964 deaths
1877 births
Academic staff of the Technical University of Berlin